Beryl Preston (2 November 1901 – 22 October 1979) was a British sailor. She competed in the 8 Metre event at the 1936 Summer Olympics.

References

External links
 

1901 births
1979 deaths
British female sailors (sport)
Olympic sailors of Great Britain
Sailors at the 1936 Summer Olympics – 8 Metre
Sportspeople from Ningbo